Gary Adcock is an American college baseball coach and former pitcher. Adcock is the head coach of the California Baptist Lancers baseball team.

Playing career
Upon graduation from high school, Adcock enrolled at University of California, Santa Barbara. Adcock pitched 7 complete games for the Gauchos in 1990. The following year, he transferred to Riverside City College.

In 1992, his junior year, he transferred to UCLA and he pitched a 6–6 record with a 6.56 ERA. He returned for his senior season at UCLA, pitching to a 3–4 record, and a 5.75 ERA.

Coaching career
Adcock joined the UCLA staff as a graduate assistant during the 1994 season. He then accepted an assistant coaching role at California Baptist University. In 1997 and 1998, he served as the pitching coach for Riverside City College. Adcock then accepted the pitching coach job at Purdue University. He helped the Boilermakers to a Big Ten Conference leading 4.12 ERA in 2000. On August 18, 2000, he returned to UCLA as a pitching coach.

In 2003, Adcock was named the head coach at California Baptist. He led the Lancers to the 2010 NAIA World Series.

Head coaching record

See also
 List of current NCAA Division I baseball coaches

References

External links
California Baptist Lancers bio

Living people
Baseball pitchers
UC Santa Barbara Gauchos baseball players
Riverside City Tigers baseball players
UCLA Bruins baseball coaches
UCLA Bruins baseball players
California Baptist Lancers baseball coaches
Riverside City Tigers baseball coaches
Purdue Boilermakers baseball coaches
Year of birth missing (living people)
Azusa Pacific University alumni